The 240 mm Howitzer Motor Carriage T92 was a self-propelled howitzer developed by the United States during World War II. The same mounting with the 8-inch Gun M1 was developed as the T93. Neither was built in significant numbers and the war ended before they could be used in combat.

History 
The towed 240 mm M1 howitzer was difficult to use due to its weight. Experience with the 155mm howitzer on the M4 chassis suggested it might be possible to  mount it on the Heavy Tank T26E3  (which was formally named "Heavy Tank M26 Pershing" in March 1945) chassis, and that the 8-inch gun could also be mounted as part of a planned "Heavy Combat Team" using the same chassis. The latter was given the designation T93 Gun Motor Carriage.

The chassis needed to be lengthened with addition of an extra road wheel, to give seven each side. The drive sprocket was also moved to the front.

A limited production run ("limited procurement") of four pilot vehicles was ordered in March 1945, and the first was finished in July of that year, only five would be built in total. Two T93 were completed by September. All contracts were terminated with the end of the hostilities.

Service 
The trials of the T92 and T93 showed that they would be useful in
Operation Downfall, the planned invasion of the Japanese mainland. To this end, special fuses for the shells were developed so they could be used against concrete. The T92s and T93s were being readied for sending to the Pacific War but the Japanese surrender occurred on 14 August 1945.

Preserved vehicles 
A surviving T92 is preserved at the Detroit Arsenal in Warren, MI.

Variants 

A similar vehicle was also built in conjunction with the T92, the T93 Gun Motor Carriage which mounted the longer 8-inch (203 mm) M1 gun instead of the 240 mm howitzer.

See also
 M110 howitzer
 List of Self-propelled field guns

References

Notes

Bibliography

External links
 T92 HMC pictures and specifications, wwiivehicles.com website (retrieved 2017-02-20)
 T93 GMC pictures and specifications, wwiivehicles.com website (retrieved 2014-02-28)

World War II self-propelled artillery
Self-propelled artillery of the United States
240 mm artillery
Military vehicles introduced from 1945 to 1949